Al-Sayyida Nafisa Mosque or Mashhad al-Sayyida Nafisa is a mosque in al-Sayyida Nafisa district (or Sebaa Valley), a section of the larger historic necropolis called al-Qarafa (or City of the Dead) in Cairo, Egypt. It is built to commemorate Sayyida Nafisa, an acclaimed Islamic scholar and a member of Bayt (household) of the Islamic prophet Muhammad. The mosque has Sayyida Nafisa's mausoleum inside. Along with the necropolis around it, it is listed as part of the UNESCO World Heritage Site of Historic Cairo.

Location
The mosque is located on Ahl al-Bayt street, where numerous mausoleums commemorating well known Islamic figures exist along the way. Al-Sayeda Nafeesah Mosque is the second destination of the street after Imam Ali Zayn al-Abideen's mausoleum. The street begins with Imam Zayn al-Abideen's maouselum and ends with Al-Sayeda Zaynab Mosque which commemorates Sayyida Zaynab, passing mausoleums of Sayyida Nafisa, Sayyida Sakinah bint Husayn, Sayyida Ruqqiyah bint Ali bin Abu Taleb, Sayyid Muhammad ibn Jafar al-Sadiq, and Sayyida 'Atikah, aunt of Muhammad.

Description 
Al-Maqrizi's plans indicate that the first person who built the tomb of Nafisa was Obaidullah ibn al-Suri, governor of Egypt during the Abbasid era. Cabin made of copper was also placed during this time. Then the shrine was reconstructed during the Fatimid era, which a dome was also added. There is however, no history available regarding the architecture on a marble tablet placed on the door of the shrine which shows the name of the Fatimid caliph Mustansir and his titles. The dome was renovated during the reign of Fatimid caliph al-Hafiz, after some cracks were occurred. The mihrab was also covered with marble in 1138. The mausoleum was renewed in the Ottoman era during the reign of Prince Abd al-Rahman Katkhuda, which he built the shrine on the form existing until today. There are entrances for male and female, and the entrances were renovated in the modern era with marbles and extravagant carpets. Inside the mosque, there exists a corridor which leads to the Sharif's room, and paintings and poems of praise concerning the Ahl al-Bayt are drawn and written over the corridor.

A new zarih over the tomb was inaugurated during the visit of the leader of the Dawoodi Bohras in June 2021.

See also

  Lists of mosques 
  List of mosques in Africa
  List of mosques in Egypt

References

External links

 Government Website of Islamic artifacts

Mosques in Cairo
Mosque buildings with domes
Mausoleums in Egypt